Robert Charles Bolles (April 24, 1928 – April 8, 1994) was an American psychologist and author who conducted work on experimental psychology. He developed the species-specific defense reaction theory which contends that many avoidance behaviors are actually elicited behaviors rather than operant behaviors.

External links

1928 births
1994 deaths
20th-century American psychologists
20th-century American writers